Clanculus multipunctatuscommon name the beautiful clanculus, is a species of sea snail, a marine gastropod mollusk in the family Trochidae, the top snails.

Description
The size of the shell varies between 10 mm and 17 mm.

Distribution
This marine species occurs off the Philippines and Australia (Western Australia and the Northern Territories)

References

 Jansen, P.I., 1995. A review of the genus Clanculus Montfort, 1810 (Gastropoda: Trochidae) in Australia, with description of a new subspecies and the introduction of a nomen novum. Vita Marina 43(1-2): 39-62.

External links
 To World Register of Marine Species
 

multipunctatus
Gastropods described in 1995